Scoglio Palumbo Lighthouse is an active lighthouse located on an islet  long and  wide just  west of the entrance to the port of  Trapani on the Sicily Channel.

Description
The tower and the lantern are white and the lantern dome is grey metallic. The lighthouse is completely automated powered by a solar unit and managed by the Marina Militare with the identification code number 3138 E.F.

See also
 List of lighthouses in Italy

References

External links
 Servizio Fari Marina Militare

Lighthouses in Italy
Buildings and structures in Sicily